Bob Bethell (November 5, 1942 – May 20, 2012) was a Republican member of the Kansas House of Representatives, representing the 113th district. He served from 1999 until his death on May 20, 2012.

Prior to his election to the House, Bethell served as mayor of the town of Alden, Kansas. He had also worked as a long term care administrator, pastor, high school vice principal, middle school principal, and college director of admissions.

He received his MEd in Administration from the University of Illinois at Urbana–Champaign and a BS in Secondary Education from John Brown University.

Bethell died May 20, 2012, after a one-car accident on Interstate 70 in Wabaunsee County, Kansas, on his way home from the conclusion of the 2012 Kansas House of Representatives legislative session. He was 69.

He was succeeded in the House of Representatives by his wife, Lorene Bethell.

Committee membership
 Commerce and Labor
 Corrections and Juvenile Justice
 Elections
 Aging and Long Term Care (Chair)
 Joint Committee on Health Policy Oversight
 Joint Committee on Home and Community Based Services Oversight (Vice-Chair)

References

External links
 Official Website
 Kansas Legislature - Bob Bethell
 Project Vote Smart profile
 Kansas Votes profile
 State Surge - Legislative and voting track record 
 Campaign contributions: 1998, 2000, 2002, 2004, 2006, 2008, 2010

1942 births
2012 deaths
John Brown University alumni
Mayors of places in Kansas
Republican Party members of the Kansas House of Representatives
Place of birth missing
Road incident deaths in Kansas
University of Illinois College of Education alumni
20th-century American politicians
21st-century American politicians